Sir William Bowyer, 1st Baronet (29 June 1612 – 2 October 1679), was an English politician who sat in the House of Commons between 1659 and 1679.

Bowyer was the eldest son of Sir Henry Bowyer and his wife Anne Salter, daughter of Sir Nicholas Salter, and was baptised at St Olave's Church, Hart Street, London.

He was educated at Jesus College, Cambridge. In 1630, he was called to the bar by Lincoln's Inn. Bowyer was High Sheriff of Buckinghamshire between 1646 and 1647 and a Member of Parliament (MP) for Buckinghamshire from 1659 until 1679. Having been a Royalist before the Restoration, he was knighted by June 1660, and afterwards made a Baronet, of Denham, in the County of Buckingham by King Charles II of England on 25 June 1660.

On 29 May 1634, he married Margaret Weld, daughter of Sir John Weld at St Olave's Church, Old Jewry, London. They had three sons and several daughters. Bowyer died intestate, aged 67, and was buried at Denham. He was succeeded in the baronetcy by his oldest son William.

References

1612 births
1679 deaths
Members of Lincoln's Inn
Baronets in the Baronetage of England
Cavaliers
High Sheriffs of Buckinghamshire
English MPs 1659
English MPs 1660
English MPs 1661–1679
Latin–English translators